The 2018 Washington State Senate elections took place as part of the biennial United States elections. Washington state voters elected state senators in 25 of the state's 49 Senate districts. The other 24 state senators were not up for re-election until the next biennial election in 2020. State senators serve four-year terms in the Washington State Senate. A statewide map of Washington's state legislative districts is provided by the Washington State Legislature here, .

A top two primary election on August 7, 2018, determined which candidates appear on the November 6 general election ballot. Each candidate is allowed to write in their party preference so that it appears as they desire on the ballot.

Following the 2016 state senate elections, Republicans maintained effective control of the Senate, 25–24 because self-identified Democrat Tim Sheldon caucuses with the Republicans. However, in 2017 Democrats regained control of the Washington State Senate after Democrat Manka Dhingra won a special election in Washington's 45th legislative district.

Democrats expanded their caucus's majority to 28–21 by further flipping the 26th, 30th, and 47th districts. Tim Sheldon was reelected as a Democrat, but continued to caucus with the Republicans.

Overview

Summary of Results by State Senate District
Districts not shown are not up for election until 2020** Incumbent did not seek re-election.

 *Tim Sheldon self-identifies as a Democrat but caucuses with the Republicans.
Source:

Detailed Primary & General Election Results by Senate District

District 6

District 7

District 8

District 13

District 15

District 21

District 26

District 29

District 30

District 31

District 32

District 33

District 34

District 35

District 36

District 37

District 38

District 39

District 42

District 43

District 44

District 45

District 46

District 47

District 48

See also
 2018 United States elections
 2018 United States House of Representatives elections in Washington
 2018 United States Senate election in Washington
 2018 Washington House of Representatives election

References

Washington State Senate elections
2018 Washington (state) elections
Washington State Senate